Erebia anyuica, the scree alpine, is a member of the subfamily Satyrinae of family Nymphalidae. It is found in Siberia, in several isolated areas of Alaska, and in a band that extends across northern Alaska and northern Yukon (British Mountains) to the Richardson Mountains on the Yukon/Northwest Territories border.

The wingspan is 31–42 mm. Adults are on wing from mid-June to late July.

Subspecies
E. a. anyuica Magadan
E. a. iltshira Belik, 1996 eastern Sayan Mountains
E. a. jakuta Dubatolov, 1992 north-eastern Yakutia
E. a. sokhondinka Dubatolov & Zintshenko, 1995

Similar species
Reddish alpine (E. lafontainei)
Four-dotted alpine (E. youngi)

References

External links 

Erebia
Butterflies described in 1966
Butterflies of Asia
Butterflies of North America